Pulmonary function testing (PFT)  is a complete evaluation of the respiratory system including patient history, physical examinations, and tests of pulmonary function. The primary purpose of pulmonary function testing is to identify the severity of pulmonary impairment.  Pulmonary function testing has diagnostic and therapeutic roles and helps clinicians answer some general questions about patients with lung disease. PFTs are normally performed by a pulmonary function technician, respiratory therapist, respiratory physiologist, physiotherapist, pulmonologist, or general practitioner.

Indications
Pulmonary function testing is a diagnostic and management tool used for a variety of reasons, such as: 

 Diagnose lung disease.
 Monitor the effect of chronic diseases like asthma, chronic obstructive lung disease, or cystic fibrosis. 
 Detect early changes in lung function. 
 Identify narrowing in the airways.
 Evaluate airway bronchodilator reactivity.
 Show if environmental factors have harmed the lungs
 Preoperative testing

Neuromuscular disorders
Pulmonary function testing in patients with neuromuscular disorders helps to evaluate the respiratory status of patients at the time of diagnosis, monitor their progress and course, evaluate them for possible surgery, and gives an overall idea of the prognosis.

Duchenne muscular dystrophy is associated with gradual loss of muscle function over time. Involvement of respiratory muscles results in poor ability to cough and decreased ability to breathe well and leads to collapse of part or all of the lung leading to impaired gas exchange and an overall insufficiency in lung strength.

Tests

Spirometry

Spirometry includes tests of pulmonary mechanics – measurements of FVC, FEV1, FEF values, forced inspiratory flow rates (FIFs), and MVV.  Measuring pulmonary mechanics assesses the ability of the lungs to move huge volumes of air quickly through the airways to identify airway obstruction.

The measurements taken by the spirometry device are used to generate a pneumotachograph that can help to assess lung conditions such as: asthma, pulmonary fibrosis, cystic fibrosis, and chronic obstructive pulmonary disease.  Physicians may also use the test results to diagnose bronchial hyperresponsiveness to exercise, cold air, or pharmaceutical agents.

Helium Dilution 

The helium dilution technique for measuring lung volumes uses a closed, rebreathing circuit.  This technique is based on the assumptions that a known volume and concentration of helium in air begin in the closed spirometer, that the patient has no helium in their lungs, and that an equilibration of helium can occur between the spirometer and the lungs.

Nitrogen Washout 

The nitrogen washout technique uses a non-rebreathing open circuit. The technique is based on the assumptions that the nitrogen concentration in the lungs is 78% and in equilibrium with the atmosphere, that the patient inhales 100% oxygen and that the oxygen replaces all of the nitrogen in the lungs.

Plethysmography

The plethysmography technique applies Boyle's law and uses measurements of volume and pressure changes to determine total lung volume, assuming temperature is constant.

There are four lung volumes and four lung capacities.  A lung's capacity consists of two or more lung volumes.  The lung volumes are tidal volume (VT), inspiratory reserve volume (IRV), expiratory reserve volume (ERV), and residual volume (RV).  The four lung capacities are total lung capacity (TLC), inspiratory capacity (IC), functional residual capacity (FRC) and vital capacity (VC).

Maximal respiratory pressures

Measurement of maximal inspiratory and expiratory pressures is indicated whenever there is an unexplained decrease in vital capacity or respiratory muscle weakness is suspected clinically.  Maximal inspiratory pressure (MIP) is the maximal pressure that can be produced by the patient trying to inhale through a blocked mouthpiece.  Maximal expiratory pressure (MEP) is the maximal pressure measured during forced expiration (with cheeks bulging) through a blocked mouthpiece after a full inhalation. Repeated measurements of MIP and MEP are useful in following the course of patients with neuromuscular disorders.

Diffusing capacity

Measurement of the single-breath diffusing capacity for carbon monoxide (DLCO) is a fast and safe tool in the evaluation of both restrictive and obstructive lung disease.

Bronchodilator responsiveness 
When a patient has an obstructive defect, a bronchodilator test is given to evaluate if airway constriction is reversible with a short acting beta-agonist. This is defined as an increase of ≥12% and ≥200 mL in the FEV1 or FVC.

Oxygen desaturation during exercise
The six-minute walk test is a good index of physical function and therapeutic response in patients with chronic lung disease, such as COPD or idiopathic pulmonary fibrosis.

Arterial blood gases
Arterial blood gases (ABGs) are a helpful measurement in pulmonary function testing in selected patients. The primary role of measuring ABGs in individuals that are healthy and stable is to confirm hypoventilation when it is suspected on the basis of medical history, such as respiratory muscle weakness or advanced COPD.

ABGs also provide a more detailed assessment of the severity of hypoxemia in patients who have low normal oxyhemoglobin saturation.

Risks 
Pulmonary function testing is a safe procedure; however, there is cause for concern regarding untoward reactions and the value of the test data should be weighed against potential hazards. Some complications include dizziness, shortness of breath, coughing, pneumothorax, and inducing an asthma attack.

Contraindications 
There are some indications against a pulmonary function test being done. These include a recent heart attack, stroke, head injury, an aneurysm, or confusion.

Technique

Preparation 
Subjects have measurements of height and weight taken before spirometry to determine what their predicted values should be. Additionally, a history of smoking, recent illness, and medications is taken.

Quality control 
In order for the forced vital capacity to be considered accurate it has to be conducted three times where the peak is sharp in the flow-volume curve and the exhalation time is longer than 6 seconds.

Reproducibility of the PFT is determined by comparing the values of forced vital capacity (FVC) and forced expiratory volume at 1 second (FEV1). The difference between the highest values of two FVCs need to be within 5% or 150 mL. When the FVC is less than 1.0 L, the difference between the highest two values must be within 100 mL. Lastly, the difference between the two highest values of FEV1 should also be within 150 mL. The highest FVC and FEV1 may be used from each different test. Until the results of three tests meet the criteria of reproducibility, the test can be repeated up to eight times. If it is still not possible to get accurate results, the best three tests are used.

Clinical significance

Changes in lung volumes and capacities from normal are generally consistent with the pattern of lung impairment.

Spirometry is required for a diagnosis of COPD.

Interpretation of tests

Professional societies such as the American Thoracic Society and the European Respiratory Society have published guidelines regarding the conduct and interpretation of pulmonary function testing to ensure standardization and uniformity in performance of tests. The interpretation of tests depends on comparing the patients values to published normals from previous studies. Deviation from guidelines can result in false-positive or false negative test results, even though only a small minority of pulmonary function laboratories followed published guidelines for spirometry, lung volumes and diffusing capacity in 2012.

COPD 
The Global Initiative for Chronic Obstructive Lung Disease provides guidelines for the diagnosis, severity, and management of COPD. To determine obstruction in a patient's lungs, the post-bronchodilator FEV1/FVC needs to be <0.7. Then, the FEV1 percentage of predicted result is used to determine the degree of obstruction where the lower the percent the worse the obstruction.

Maximum respiratory pressures 
Several calculations are needed for what a normal maximum inspiratory (MIP) and expiratory pressure (MEP) is. For males this found by:

and

To find the lower limit of what is acceptable in males the equations are:

and 

For females, the equations are slightly different. For the normal values this is used:

and

For find the lower limit of what it should be without impairment this form of the equations is used:

and

where 

  = maximum inspiratory pressure in cmH20
 = maximum expiratory pressure in cmH20
  = maximum inspiratory pressure lower limit of normal in cmH20
  = maximum expiratory pressure lower limit of normal in cmH20
  = the patient's age in years

References 

 
Respiratory therapy
Medical tests